The Dorchester Heights Monument is a large public monument in the Dorchester Heights area of Boston, Massachusetts, United States. The monument, consisting of a  marble tower, honors the evacuation of Boston during the American Revolutionary War, an early American victory in the conflict. The monument is located near where George Washington ordered the construction of a redoubt, an area which has since been developed as a public park. It was designed by the architectural firm of Peabody & Stearns and was dedicated on March 17, 1902 (Evacuation Day).

History

Background 
On the outbreak of the American Revolutionary War, American troops commenced a lengthy siege of Boston, which was controlled by British forces. This siege ended in 1776 when, on March 17, American General George Washington constructed a redoubt atop Dorchester Heights in what is now South Boston. Following this, British troops under General William Howe retreated from the city. The evacuation of Boston was the first major American victory and Washington's first victory in the war. Today, March 17 is recognized in Boston as Evacuation Day, a local holiday. In 1853, the area where the redoubts stood was converted to a municipal park. The park, centered on Telegraph Hill, was called Thomas Park and was one of the first public parks in the city.

In June 1898, the Massachusetts General Court passed a resolution appropriating $25,000 for the creation of a monument at Dorchester Heights to commemorate the construction of the redoubts that led to the British evacuation. Following this, the Governor of Massachusetts assembled a committee with his Executive Council and in May 1899 opened a limited competition for designs for the monument. Eight architectural firms submitted proposals, and in October 1899 the submission by Peabody & Stearns was selected. The following month, construction bidding commenced. In both 1901 and 1902, the General Court voted to increase funding for the construction, the first time for $8,000 and the second time for $3,000. Additionally, a total of $10,000 was appropriated for dedication purposes. In total, construction on the monument lasted from 1899 to 1902.

Dedication 
The dedication ceremony for the monument occurred on March 17, 1902, on the 126th anniversary of the evacuation of Boston. The celebrations began around noon with a procession of members of the United States Marine Corps, with Governor Winthrop M. Crane and other guests of honor riding in a carriage. After the Governor and guests had assembled at the monument, the Marine band played "The Star-Spangled Banner". Afterwards, Governor Crane gave an address to the crowd and a tablet in the front of the monument, which previously had been covered with American flags, was unveiled, after which the band played "America".

Following this, the ceremony moved to the nearby South Boston High School, where an orchestra performed the overture from Mignon. Afterwards, a prayer was given by William Fairfield Warren (then-President of Boston University) and a quartet sang "Almighty Father". The orchestra then performed "Narcissus" before noted singer Alice May Bates Rice gave a solo rendition of "The Star-Spangled Banner". This was followed by an oration by Massachusetts politician and statesman Henry Cabot Lodge. The quartet then sang "The Victor's Return", which was followed by another playing of "America" before the ceremony ended with the orchestra playing "American Airs".

On June 21, 1997, the monument was rededicated following a $4.8 million renovation of the park.

Design 

The monument's design is in the Georgian Revival architectural style. At the top of this structure is a platform surrounded by a balustrade. Atop this platform climbs another, smaller tower which is topped by an octagonal lantern. Each column has an observation platform, with the top one giving a view of the city, Boston Harbor, and the surrounding area. The top of the monument features a cupola and a spire, topped by a weather vane.

While initial considerations were given to brick or granite, the monument was ultimately constructed with white marble. The structure bears an intentional similarity to the steeple of colonial meeting houses. The entrance into the structure is located on its east side, while the west side bears a tablet containing gilded letters prepared by Charles William Eliot, President of Harvard University. The inscription reads:

The monument is one of several in the city related to events from the American Revolution, including the Beacon Hill Monument and the Bunker Hill Monument.

References

Bibliography

Further reading

External links 

 
 

1776 in the Thirteen Colonies
1902 establishments in Massachusetts
1902 sculptures
American Revolutionary War monuments and memorials
Historic district contributing properties in Massachusetts
History of Boston
Landmarks in South Boston
Marble sculptures in Massachusetts
Massachusetts in the American Revolution
Monuments and memorials in Boston
National Register of Historic Places in Boston
Outdoor sculptures in Boston
Towers completed in 1902
Towers in Massachusetts